The 1981 Australian Touring Car Championship was a CAMS sanctioned motor racing title for drivers of Group C Touring Cars. The championship, which was the 22nd running of the Australian Touring Car Championship, began at Symmons Plains Raceway and ended at Lakeside International Raceway after 8 rounds.

Dick Johnson, using the Falcon built with the money he received after TV viewers had pledged AUD$72,000 following his crash with 'The Rock' at Bathurst the previous year (Ford Australia boss of the day Edsel Ford II had personally matched the amount dollar for dollar), won his first ATCC ahead of defending champion Peter Brock in his Holden Dealer Team Commodore. Johnson and Brock were the only drivers to win during the championship which came down to the final round on Dick's home track at Lakeside. Johnson won the race from Brock, the two battling all the way to the Chequered flag in what many believe to be one of the best ATCC races in history. Johnson later praised Brock, claiming that he had every opportunity to punt him off the road at Lakeside, while Brock also praised Johnson who held his nerve and won a clean race.

Classes
Cars competed in two engine displacement classes:
 Up to and including 3000cc
 3001–6000cc

Points system
Championship points were awarded on a 9-6-4-3-2-1 basis to the first six placegetters in each class at each round. Bonus points were awarded on a 4-3-2-1 basis to the top four placegetters irrespective of class at each round.
Only the best seven round results could be retained by each driver.

Round positions at rounds which were run in two parts were determined by allocating points on a 20-16-13-11-10-9-8-7-6-5-4-3-2-1 basis to the first fourteen placegetters in each part. These points were then aggregated to determine the results for that round. However a different method of determining round positions was used for Round 6 at Adelaide International Raceway where points were allocated on a 20-16-13-11-10-9-8-7-6-5-4-3-2-1 basis to the first fourteen placegetters in each class in each part.

Entrants and drivers

The following entrants and drivers competed in the 1981 Australian Touring Car Championship.

Results and standings

Race calendar
The 1981 Australian Touring Car Championship was contested over an eight-round series with Rounds 1, 3, 5, 7 & 8 being single race rounds and Rounds 2, 4 & 6 being two race rounds.

Championship standings
Colin Bond, driving an under 3 litre Ford Capri took seven class wins in the first seven rounds, but did not race at the final round as he was unlikely to improve his nett score. With Dick Johnson and Peter Brock only twice failing to take the top two positions (Johnson was third at Calder, and Brock did not finish at Sandown), they were classified ahead of Bond due to the bonus points they each received for their outright placings.

Note: Points which could not be retained under the "best seven rounds" rule are shown in the above table within brackets.

References

External links
 Official V8 Supercar site Contains historical ATCC information.
 1981 Australian Touring Car racing images at autopics.com.au
 1981 Western Australian race results 

Australian Touring Car Championship seasons
Touring Cars